Kosovo District (Serbian: Косовски округ/Kosovski okrug) is a district of Kosovo and Metohija. After the Kosovo War, the UN administration created the District of Pristina and District of Ferizaj from this district, which Serbia does not recognize.

It was located in the middle and had a population of 672,292. Its capital was Pristina.

Municipalities
The district included the municipalities of:

Podujevo
Pristina
Ferizaj
Obilić
Drenas
Lipljan
Kosovo Polje
Štimlje
Štrpce
Kaçanik

Culture and history
In the immediate vicinity of Priština there is the site of a settlement from the Neolithic period, as well as of the Roman settlement of Vicianum. Also near Priština is the Gračanica monastery, the last endowment of the Serbian King Stefan Milutin, built in 1315. Its architecture and fresco painting make it one of the most significant medieval monuments in all Europe. Today it is an active monastery for women, and open to visitors. In the center of Priština also stands the Carsi mosque (Tas mosque), built after the Battle of Kosovo.

Notes

Note: All official material made by Serbia public  Information was taken from the Government of Serbia's official website.

Districts in Kosovo and Metohija